Sandyford Henderson Memorial Church is a Parish church of the Church of Scotlandthat covers the Finnieston, Kelvinhaugh and Yorkhill areas of Glasgow, Scotland.

History
The church was built in the Neo-Gothic style between 1854 and 1856, on designs by John Thomas Emmett, but then completed by John Honeyman. It was established as Sandyford United Presbyterian Church. In 1929, it became a parish church of the Church of Scotland, while in 1938, it united with Henderson Memorial to form Sandyford Henderson Memorial Church.

Works of Art
The church includes a number of stained glass windows in geometric/floral patterns made by Ballantine & Allan in 1857. The three pictorial west windows are the work of William Wailes, and which were made between 1859 and 1860. The stained glass windows were restored between 2008 and 2009. A WWI memorial was installed in the church in 1922 remembering the 20 men from the parish who died in the war.  The exterior stonework of the church was restored in 2000, and an interior refurbishment was carried out in 2004.

References

Churches completed in 1856
Church of Scotland churches in Glasgow
Listed churches in Glasgow
Category B listed buildings in Glasgow
1854 establishments in Scotland
19th-century Church of Scotland church buildings